James McEvoy (19 September 1930 – 8 March 2007) was a British military officer, educationist and teacher.

Biography
An Old Amplefordian (Junior House 1942–44; St Aidan's House September 1944 – December 1948), he was an only child, born and raised in Lancashire. He came to Ampleforth’s Junior House in 1942, aged 12, and then was in St. Aidan's House between September 1944 and December 1948.

He then studied at St. Mary's Teaching Training College at Strawberry Hill (St Mary's University College, Twickenham). He taught at the Catholic Primary School in Warrington. He then joined the British Army’s Educational Corps, being in Singapore for a time, teaching English to Gurkhas.

After leaving the army, he returned to teaching. He was Principal of Teaching Centres, firstly in Cheshire and later in Sefton and Crosby. He retired in 1992. Subsequently, he worked for the Officers Association (a military benevolent society). He was a member of the Conservative Group in his constituency.

Family
James McEvoy married Jacquie Carter in 1976; they had a daughter, Jane (born 1979).

Death
In March 2007 he went to hospital for an operation and was recovering well until he went into cardiac arrest and died, aged 76, on 8 March 2007.

References

1930 births
2007 deaths
Alumni of St Mary's University, Twickenham
British educational theorists
Schoolteachers from Lancashire
People educated at Ampleforth College
People from Warrington
Place of death missing